The People's Olympiad (Catalan: Olimpíada Popular, Spanish: Olimpiada Popular) was a planned international multi-sport event that was intended to take place in Barcelona, the capital of the autonomous region of Catalonia within the Spanish Republic. It was conceived as a protest event against the 1936 Summer Olympics being held in Berlin, which was then under control of the Nazi Party.

Despite gaining support from some athletes, and most significantly Joseph Stalin's Soviet Union and the Communist International organization, the People's Olympiad was never held, as a result of the outbreak of the Spanish Civil War. Fifty-six years later, Barcelona hosted the 1992 Summer Olympics.

Background

In 1931, the International Olympic Committee had selected Berlin, then the capital of the Weimar Republic, to host the 1936 Summer Olympics at the 29th IOC Session in Barcelona. Berlin had defeated Barcelona, which was also vying to host the games, by 43 votes to 16. During the same year, Spain had adopted a republican constitution, with King Alfonso XIII going into exile, and Catalonia was declared an autonomous region inside the new Spanish Republic.

Following the 1936 general election in Spain, the newly elected Popular Front government (which included the Communist Party of Spain) decided that Spain would boycott the Berlin Olympics in Germany, which was now under Adolf Hitler's NSDAP government, and host its own games. Invitations were made to many different countries, and it was planned to use the hotels built for the 1929 Barcelona International Exposition as an Olympic-style Village. The games were scheduled to be held from July 19 to 26 and would have therefore ended six days prior to the start of the Berlin games. In addition to the usual sporting events, the Barcelona games would also have featured chess, folkdancing, music and theatre.

A total of 6,000 athletes from 22 nations registered for the games. The largest contingents of athletes came from the United States, the United Kingdom, the Netherlands, Belgium, Czechoslovakia, Denmark, Norway, Sweden and French Algeria. There were also teams from Germany and Italy made up of political exiles from those countries. Teams representing Jewish exiles, Alsace, Galicia, Catalonia and the Basque Country also registered. The Soviet Union, under the rule of Joseph Stalin, had been holding its own version of the Olympics, known as the Spartakiad, organised by Red Sport International. Despite this, the Soviets agreed to attend the Barcelona competition.

Many of the athletes were sent by trade unions, workers' clubs and associations, socialist and communist parties, and left-wing groups, rather than by state-sponsored committees.

With the outbreak of the Spanish Civil War just as the games were to begin, the alternate games were hastily cancelled. Some athletes never made it to Barcelona as the borders had been closed, while many who were in the city for the beginning of the games made a hasty exit. However, at least 200 of the athletes, such as Clara Thalmann, remained in Spain and joined workers' militias that were organized to defend the Second Spanish Republic against the nationalists.

See also
Wide is the Gate – an Upton Sinclair novel starting in Barcelona
International Workers' Olympiads
Spartakiad
Games of the New Emerging Forces
Liberty Bell Classic
Friendship Games
Goodwill Games
1992 Summer Olympics

References

Further reading

 Chapter Six of Berlin Games – How Hitler Stole the Olympic Dream, by Guy Walters  (UK) 0060874120 (USA)

External links
Documents on the People's Olympiad from "Trabajadores: The Spanish Civil War through the eyes of organised labour", a digitised collection of more than 13,000 pages of documents from the archives of the British Trades Union Congress held in the Modern Records Centre, University of Warwick

1936 in Spanish sport
1936 Summer Olympics
Anti-fascism
Cancelled multi-sport events
History of Barcelona
International sports boycotts
Multi-sport events in Spain
Politics and sports
Protests in Catalonia
Second Spanish Republic
Spanish Civil War
Sports competitions in Barcelona